Abbi may refer to
Given name or nickname
Abbi (musician) (born Absalom Nyinza), Kenyan Afro-jazz and Afro-fusion musician 
Abbi (Saxon), 8th century Saxon warrior
Abbi Aitken (born 1991), Scottish cricketer
Abbi Fisher (born 1957), American alpine skier 
Abbi Glines (born 1977), American novelist
Abbi Grant (born 1995), Scottish footballer
Abbi Jacobson (born 1984), American comedian, writer, actress and illustrator 
Abbi Tatton, English news reporter

Surname
Anvita Abbi (born 1949), Indian linguist
Rajni Abbi, Indian lawyer and politician 

Places
Abbi, Uzo-Uwani, a village in Uzo-Uwani state, Nigeria

See also
Abbey (disambiguation)
Abby (disambiguation)
Abi